Koompassia malaccensis is a tropical rainforest tree species up to 60 m tall in the family Fabaceae. It is native to Peninsular Malaysia, Singapore, Borneo and Thailand. It is threatened by habitat loss. A common name for this wood is kempas, it is used as a flooring material.

References

Dialioideae
Flora of Malaya
Flora of Borneo
Flora of Thailand
Conservation dependent plants